Absolute Obedience, known in Japan as  is one of the few BL game titles to see an official English release. The game is set in postwar West Germany, but makes little attempt at historical or linguistic accuracy. Released in the US by JAST USA, publishers of Enzai and Teikoku Sensenki respectively.

Overview
The game is set in post-World War II West Germany. The developers have taken a lot of historical freedoms, as the exact year is never mentioned. One of the storylines involves a dramatic motorcycle race to the Berlin Wall and back, so the game must be set sometime after 1961.
The player takes the role of either Kia WelBehenna or Louise Hardwich, one of the two members of a secret agency run by Louise Hardwich. The two are assigned to specific targets, which range from members of the KGB to aspiring soccer players. The requests usually include seducing the said targets.

Gameplay
Game interaction is extremely limited, as Absolute Obedience is a visual novel. Most of the game consists of reading text and seeing stationary artwork, most of which is yaoi-themed. Each character of the game has a Japanese voice-over actor to supplement the text during conversations between characters. The English release also uses the original Japanese voices together with the English translated text.

Player input is limited to, at a few junctions in the story, the ability to choose one of two paths. However, these choices do not give the player the ability to truly affect the storyline, only the endings. The primary goal is to fulfill the client's requests and complete the mission.

But despite the simple gameplay Absolute Obedience offers a variety of very complex character designs for the main characters as well as their "targets".

Each of the 12 stories have up to 4 different endings, leaving the player with the choice of 42 different endings and 2 additional endings.

In order to obtain a good ending, the player must select the correct choices in a specific order. Some Requests lose some of their options at some point and become listed as "expired". This may be related to the order the specific Requests are fulfilled in and/or rankings received in each Request as it is completed.
Therefore, it is rather difficult to get every ending and every scene without help. Also, each mission is given a grade: A, B, C, or D, D being the worst.

When the game has been successfully completed with an A grade in each requests, the game unlocks two additional secret missions for both Kia and Louise, in which more of both their pasts is revealed.

When the secret missions have been completed and you restart the game, the image on the main page changes.

Characters

Kia WelBehenna
(キア・ウェルベーナ)
Voiced by: Yusei Oda
Nationality: German

One of the two main characters in the game. He grew up in a poor household and lost his mother when he was 14 years old. He has no siblings. His father was a drunk, and when Kia was 10 years old, his father threw a piece of burning wood after his mother. But Kia shielded her and was hit instead. His left arm was badly scarred by the fire. He could never look at it without getting sick, until Louise told Kia to see it as an honorable wound from defending a Lady.

Kia worked to earn money at a butchers shop after school. The butcher and his family loved Kia as their own son, and meant to leave the shop to Kia. But he suddenly left his job to become a soldier in the German army. He holds the rank of Private. He is still enrolled as a soldier, and works as an agent purely for the money and the excitement: "I help people for fun and profit."

An overly confident youth who is short-tempered, cocky and emotional, he's known for mouthing off to others, although he's very smart. He drives a Harley-Davidson XA and prefers a gun for weapon. He has a German Shepherd named Tigg.

He hates guys who try to act cute to get attention: he likes his men proud, stubborn, and bold. He never falls for other guys, but tries to get them to fall for him instead. Kia has sworn to never say the words "I love you" to anyone ever again because all the people he has ever loved have died.

Louise Hardwich
(ルイーズ・ハルトヴィック)
Voiced by: Murakami Tatsuya

One of the two main characters in the game. The only son and heir to the wealthy and powerful Hardwich family. His childhood was lonely and he was raised by maids and a nanny. His parents never showed any affection towards him, and live their own life apart. It is mentioned in the game that "Louise did not lose his smile in a world like this, even though his heart grew cold". Because of his family Louise has the political influence and the money to get the job done.

Always sure of himself, Louise is very good-looking, but sometimes his big mouth gets him into difficult situations. He's not above acting coy if it will help him get what he wants. His military rank is Second Lieutenant. On the wishes of his father Louise was conscripted into the army, but only for one month, and because of his family Louise got special treatment.

He always carries his favorite bull whip wherever he goes, and seldom uses a gun. Very charismatic, and tries to be everybody's friend.
Louise never drives himself, but has Gallacher chauffeur his black Mercedes-Benz.
As a hobby Louise breeds horses, mostly those of the German Steier breed.

Gallacher Morlock
(ギャラハー・モーロック)
Voiced by: Mamoru Seno

Nothing much is known about Gallachers past or his family.
He is servant and bodyguard of Kia and Louise, he's proud of his carefully chosen macho style. He believes that nothing is more important than a promise made between men. He has a tendency to stick his nose into other people's business, which gets him into trouble sometimes.

He is the one who brings the request dossiers to Kia and Louise, and discuss prices with the clients.
Gallacher is the commentator and sometimes the comic relief of Absolute Obedience.

Kia's targets
Request 1: Capture the Thief !

Target: Silvio Wenzel / Schwarz Kreuz (English: Black Cross)
Voiced by: Yu Sakai
The mysterious thief who disturbs postwar Germany. Actually the last heir to a wealthy family that was supposed to be killed in the war. He wants to reassemble his family's collection of artwork called the Porto Collection that was scattered after the Wenzel family's downfall. Silvio has dark hair and wears a blindfold around his eyes to hide his identity. Without the blindfold he has red eyes. His personality is somewhat cocky.
Possible endings: 4
Client: Simon Hertzsch. A high-ranking police officer who seeks revenge for the death of his daughter, who was killed in the crossfire by the police during one of Silvio's heists.

Request 2: The Selfish Prince's Holiday

Target: Ashraf Ali Ibrahim
Voiced by: Kisho Taniyama 
An Arab prince from the Kingdom of Mahat. There is a rumor going around that he's visiting West Germany in search of a wife, but when the press is after him he merely tells the reporters that he has only come to "drink German beer".
Because he's third in line to take over the Kingdom from his father, he has many enemies. Many people have attempted to assassinate him or ruin him.
Possible endings: 4
Client: Majd, Ali's uncle. He is second in line to succeed, who wants the potential rival out of the way by all means necessary.

Request 3 : The Gay Man's Trap

Target: Dirk Wahl
Voiced by: Hiyama Nobuyuki
A youth known for flying off the handle, he's a charismatic and natural leader of others. Rash and reckless, Dirk is also stubborn, but a caring vigilante leader. Angry at Martin Adenauer for his illegal development downtown. He fights on behalf of the Berlin people against the corrupt real estate syndicate.
Possible endings: 4
Client: Martin Adenauer himself, who wants to eliminate a roadblock to his real estate development plans.

Request 4 : The Devilish Little Gigolo

Target: Timo Wilkes
Voiced by: Haruka Shibahara
The son of a judge, he rebels against his father's overbearing tendencies by refusing to date girls, and has found a new life as a male prostitute. Timo has white hair and blue eyes. In one of the character arts, he is shown wearing a bunny suit.
Possible endings: 3
Client: His father, Wolfgang Wilkes, who wants him to grow up and find someone to love, even if it's another man.

Request 5: Coach is a Worrywart

Target: Jens Lewin
Voiced by: Yoshino Hiroyuki
A soccer ace who is moving up in the sport. He's attained his skill at the game through hard work, despite his family's poverty. He has a penchant for taking female fans home after games. He drives a Harley-Davidson 61-A.
Possible endings: 3
Client: Gregor Kleine, Jens' coach. He sees the amazing potential in Jens, but believes he won't be able to go pro until he gives up those girls.

Request 6: A Blasphemy Before God

Target: Eduard Wernicke
Voiced by: Suyama Akio
A student at a religious school, Eduard has pledged his life to God. He is a stoic, straightforward young man, who often thinks too deeply about things. He often suffers feelings of self-loathing. Has great potential, and his teachers and classmates think he should aspire to become a bishop.
Possible endings: 3
Client: Eduard Wernicke, but Eduards father also wants him out of the school and live a normal life.

Request Ex: Top Secret Request

Possible endings: 1
Client: Unknown

Louise's targets
Request 1: The Betrayer's Retribution

Target: Major Lawless Streich, "Masked Man"
Voiced by: Kazuya Ichijō
A blond-haired military man. He never shows his emotions and for that has attained his nickname, the "Masked Man". Ever since his current commander, Lieutenant General Michard, got him transferred to the Military Police, Lawless has been sexually abused by Michard to pay his debt for him. Lawless had the rank of Brigadier General, but was demoted to Major when he transferred to the Military Police from the First Armored Division.
Possible endings: 4
Client: Colonel Franz Berger. Former commander of Lawless, and head of the First Armored Division. He wants revenge for a betrayal many years ago.

Request 2: For my Beloved Spy

Target: Zhores Barsoukova, "The Ice Queen"
Voiced by: Kenichi Suzumura
A Russian spy who's known for his coldness. He works for the KGB and takes advantage of the postwar confusion to secretly send information back to his home country. In Germany he poses as an ordinary librarian.
Possible endings: 4
Client: Reiner Müller. A British spy who works for UK's SIS and has had valuable information stolen by Zhores in the past after falling into his "Sweet Trap".

Request 3: The High-Class Prostitute's Prank

Target: Werner Herzog
Voiced by: Kōsuke Toriumi
A powerful mafia heir. He exudes masculine charms, captivating the hearts of women everywhere he goes. He loves cigars, and usually has at least four beautiful women at his side. He's proud and quick-thinking. His father has entered politics and detests the possibility that Werner could cause a scandal that could hurt his career.
Possible endings: 4
Client: Franziska Schleiden. A high-class prostitute who wants Louise to teach Werner the joy of other men as a practical joke.

Request 4: The Man Driven Mad by an Angel

Target: Anel Metzelder
Voiced by: Aoi Kisaragi
A boy with an angelic smile. He was raised with great care, totally ignorant of the pain and sorrow of the outside world. He is kind and delicate, compared to his father, who beats and screams at the servants.
Possible endings: 3
Client: Joachim Basler. A servant who has been working in the mansion for 7 years.

Request 5: The Maidens' Wish

Target: Ferdinand Marienfield
Voiced by: Jun Fukushima
An eccentric upper-class young man. He likes to play the piano, drink tea, and many other elegant things. His overactive imagination and his narcissistic personality are his weak points.
Possible endings: 3
Client: Ferdinand's 5 maids: Monica Thieme, Nicknamed "The Young Master's Royal Guard". They want to find an attractive lover for their beloved master.

Request 6: Take Down the Rival!

Target: Doctor Hagen Haller
Voiced by: Yu Kurosawa
His personality is a little twisted. Perhaps because other men are always jealous of him, or because he's crazy for the ladies, he treats other men very coldly. However, he's very warm and kind to women. He and Berti grew up together, but Hagen always stole Berti's girlfriends. They are rivals.
Possible endings: 3
Client: Doctor Berti Schneider. Although he has a persecution complex, he's handsome, well-bred, and intelligent. He's just unlucky. Although he might be somewhat obsessed, it would not be an exaggeration to label Hagen as the cause of his problems. During the request, Berti Schneider realizes that he is actually in love with Hagen.

Request Ex: Top Secret Request

Possible endings: 1
Client: Unknown

Game credits
 Planning, Direction and Artwork: Yura
 Scenario: Yurino Nao
 Scenario Assist: Yuuma
 Background Music: Arurukan

References

External links
 Official website for Absolute Obedience 
 JAST USA page for Absolute Obedience

2005 video games
Cold War video games
Romance video games
Video games developed in Japan
Video games set in Germany
Windows games
Windows-only games
Yaoi video games